Coleophora viridicuprella is a moth of the family Coleophoridae. It is found in the United States, including California and Oregon.

The larvae feed on the seeds of Juncus species. They create a trivalved, tubular silken case.

References

viridicuprella
Moths of North America
Moths described in 1882